The Alp Devils are an American football team based in Visoko, Šenčur, Slovenia. They reached the inaugural Slovenian Bowl in 2010, where they lost to the Ljubljana Silverhawks.

History
The Alp Devils were founded in 2008, together with the Maribor Generals and Gold Diggers. The Devils reached the inaugural Slovenian Bowl in 2010, where they lost 41–0 to the Ljubljana Silverhawks.

Honours
 Slovenian Football League
 Runners-up: 2009–10, 2016, 2017
 
 Runners-up: 2014
Third place: 2013
 CEFL Cup
 Runners-up: 2017

References

American football teams in Slovenia
2008 establishments in Slovenia
American football teams established in 2008